Frank Ball may refer to:

 Frank Clayton Ball (1857–1943), American industrialist and philanthropist
 SS Frank C. Ball, an American bulk carrier
 Frank Ball (golfer) (1892–?), English golfer
 Frank Livingston Ball, member of the Virginia Senate
 Frank Thornton Ball (1921–2013), English actor, better known as Frank Thornton